Cincinnati consists of fifty-two neighborhoods.

Many of these neighborhoods were once villages that have been annexed by the City of Cincinnati. The most important of them retain their former names, such as Walnut Hills and Mount Auburn.

List
Neighborhoods are numbered and categorized by Cincinnati Police districts. Many neighborhoods have smaller communities and/or historic districts primarily within their boundaries, and those are denoted with bullet points.

District One

Downtown
The Banks (Riverfront)
Central Business District
East Fourth Street District
East Manufacturing & Warehouse District
Fort Washington
Lytle Park District
Ninth Street District
Race Street District
West Fourth Street District
Mount Adams
Over-the-Rhine
Brewery District
Gateway Quarter
Mohawk District
Northern Liberties
Schwartz's Point
Sycamore-13th Street District
Pendleton
Queensgate
West End
Betts-Longworth District
Brighton
City West (Lincoln Court)
Dayton Street District
Frenchman's Corner
Laurel Homes

District Two

California
Columbia-Tusculum
Fulton
East End
East Walnut Hills
DeSales Corner
Edgecliff
Evanston
Idlewild
O'Bryonville
Hyde Park
Observatory District
Dutchtown
Kennedy Heights
Linwood
Madisonville
Mount Lookout
Mount Washington
Oakley
Eastwood
Pleasant Ridge
Dallman's Corner

District Three

East Price Hill
Incline District
St Lawrence Corners
East Westwood
English Woods
Lower Price Hill
Millvale
Moosewood
North Fairmount
Knox Hill
Riverside
Anderson Ferry (Constance)
Sayler Park
Sedamsville
South Cumminsville
South Fairmount
Barrsville
The Villages of Roll Hill (formerly Fay Apartments)
West Price Hill
Old Covedale
Cedar Grove
Westwood
Lafeuille Terrace
Werk Place
Western Hills
Westwood Town Center

District Four

Avondale
Bond Hill
Carthage
Corryville
Short Vine District
Vernon Gardens
Hartwell
Mount Auburn (Keys Hill)
Glencoe (Inwood, formerly Little Bethlehem)
Goat Hill
Jerusalem
Prospect Hill
North Avondale
Paddock Hills
Roselawn
Walnut Hills
Gilbert-Sinton District
Gilbert Row
Peebles' Corner

District Five

Camp Washington
Clifton
Gaslight District
Ludlow Avenue District
College Hill
Hollywood (Teakwood)
CUF
Clifton Heights
Fairview
University Heights
The Heights
Rohs Hill
Mount Airy
Fox Acres
Northside (formerly Cumminsville)
Hoffner District
Knowlton's Corner
Spring Grove Village (formerly Winton Place)
Winton Hills
Winton Terrace

See also
Many communities within the Cincinnati – Northern Kentucky metropolitan area are considered by local residents to be neighborhoods or suburbs of Cincinnati, but do not fall within the actual city limits, Hamilton county boundaries, or even within Ohio state borders.

Ohio
Communities of Butler County
Communities of Clermont County
Communities of Hamilton County
Includes several enclaves within Cincinnati's outside city limits, such as St. Bernard, Elmwood Place, and Norwood
Communities of Warren County

Kentucky
Communities of Boone County
Communities of Campbell County
Communities of Kenton County

Indiana
Communities of Dearborn County
Communities of Franklin County
Communities of Ohio County

References 

 Cincinnati Department of Trade & Development
 In-Depth Neighborhood Guides
 Cincinnati, OH Neighborhood Guide

External links 
Finding Aid for City of Cincinnati annexation records, Archives and Rare Books Library, University of Cincinnati, Cincinnati, Ohio
Help contribute to finding Cincinnati hoods

Cincinnati
neighborhoods